OnePointFive (stylized in all caps) is the third mixtape by American rapper Aminé. It was released on August 15, 2018, through Republic Records and Club Banana. The project follows his debut studio album Good for You (2017). The project features guest appearances by G Herbo, Gunna and Rico Nasty. The project was executively produced by Aminé himself, alongside frequent collaborator Pasqué, and features production from Tee-Watt, alongside a variety of producers, including LDG Beats, Charlie Brown, Ckwnce and Davon Jamison, among others.

Background
A day before the album's release, Aminé released a video teaser, referring it as an "LP/EP/Mixtape/Album". Furthermore, he explained how "Mixtapes are albums and albums are mixtapes. Niggas call they albums mixtapes 'cause if [it] flops, it's an EP. Nah, that's like a b-side, bro."

Promotion 
The music video for, "Reel It In", was released on September 7, 2018. It was later serviced to US rhythmic contemporary radio stations as the lead single from the mixtape on September 25. A remix was later released featuring rapper Gucci Mane on November 20.

The music video for, "Blackjack", was released on January 23, 2019. A remix featuring rapper YBN Cordae was released on February 8.

Track listing
Credits adapted from Tidal.

Notes
  signifies a co-producer
  signifies an additional producer
 All tracks are stylized in all caps

Personnel
Credits adapted from Tidal.

 Morning Estrada – recording , mixing 
 David Nakaji – mixing 
 Jacob Richards – mixing assistance 
 Mike Seaberg – mixing assistance 
 Emmanuel Gallegos – mixing assistance

Charts

References

2018 albums
Aminé (rapper) albums
Republic Records albums
Trap music albums